The 2018 National Invitation Tournament was a single-elimination tournament of 32 NCAA Division I college men's basketball teams that were not selected to participate in the 2018 NCAA tournament. The first three rounds of the annual tournament were played on campus sites (the host team being the higher seeded team). The semifinals and championship game were held at Madison Square Garden in New York City.

Experimental rules
In February 2018, the NCAA approved a number of experimental rule changes for use in this tournament:
 Games were played in 10-minute quarters instead of 20-minute halves. The NCAA has used this timing convention for women's basketball since the 2015–16 season.
 As in NCAA women's basketball, as well as the 2017 NIT, there were no "one-and-one" foul shots. Starting with the fifth foul in each quarter, non-shooting fouls by the defense resulted in two free throws, with the exception of administrative technical fouls (for which only one shot is awarded). The 2018 NIT, however, returned to the standard NCAA procedure of treating overtime periods as extensions of the final period of regulation for purposes of team foul accumulation.
 The shot clock was reset to 20 seconds after an offensive rebound.

Notes

Participants

Automatic qualifiers
The following  teams were guaranteed berths into the 2018 NIT field by having the best regular season record in their conference but failing to either win their conference tournament or earn an at-large berth in the 2018 NCAA tournament.

Grambling State won the SWAC regular season title but was banned from the postseason due to low graduation rates and did not participate in the conference tournament. There was thus no automatic qualifier from the SWAC.

At-large bids
The following 20 teams were also awarded NIT berths.

Bids by conference

Seeds

Schedule
The NIT Tournament began on Tuesday, March 13, 2018. Due to a conflict at Taco Bell Arena (with the NCAA tournament), Boise State travelled to the University of Washington for their first round match. The first three rounds were played on campus sites. The Semifinals were held on Tuesday, March 27, and the Championship Game was held on Thursday, March 29, at Madison Square Garden in New York City.

Bracket

^ Game played at Washington due to Taco Bell Arena hosting First and Second Round 2018 NCAA tournament games.

* Denotes overtime period

Media
ESPN, Inc. had exclusive television rights to all of the NIT Games. It was telecast every game across ESPN, ESPN2, ESPNU, and ESPN3. Westwood One had exclusive radio rights to the semifinals and the championship.

See also
2018 Women's National Invitation Tournament

References

National Invitation
National Invitation Tournament
2010s in Manhattan
National Invitation Tournament
Basketball competitions in New York City
College sports in New York City
Madison Square Garden
National Invitation Tournament
National Invitation Tournament
Sports in Manhattan